NFL '97 is a follow-up video game to Sega's Joe Montana series on the Sega Genesis. NFL 97 was released exclusively for the Sega Saturn.

New gameplay features included the ability to control the speed with which the ball is thrown and the use of a blue arc to track possible receivers.

Reception

NFL 97 received mostly poor reviews. Critics highly praised the play editor, but criticized the player animations, the camera, and various aspects of the gameplay. Tom Ham elaborated in GameSpot: "For example, it's hard to distinguish who the receiver is, and the quarterback takes too long to hand the ball off. Even executing a kickoff was painful." Next Generation found the most fault with the passing arc, while GamePro focused on the limited number of player moves, and concluded that "with so many serious flaws, the game's just no fun to play." Kraig Kujawa of Electronic Gaming Monthly simply said that "it hurts to play NFL '97." Colin Ferris gave it a positive review in Game Revolution, citing the playbook editor, bigger player graphics, and control of passing arc.

References

External links 
NFL '97 at GameSpot
GameFAQs

1996 video games
NFL Sports Talk Football video games
North America-exclusive video games
Sega Saturn games
Sega Saturn-only games
Sega video games
Video games developed in the United States
Multiplayer and single-player video games